Keeping Up with the Steins is a 2006 comedy film directed by Scott Marshall, and starring Garry Marshall, Jeremy Piven, Jami Gertz and Daryl Hannah. The film is a commentary on how too many Jewish families see a bar mitzvah or bat mitzvah not as a coming of age for their son or daughter, but rather as an excuse to throw outrageously lavish parties which end in drama.

Plot
Benjamin Fiedler is the 13-year-old son of Jewish couple Adam and Joanne Fiedler. After attending the elaborate bar mitzvah party for the son of Arnie Stein - which was done on a cruise ship, with a Titanic theme - Benjamin's parents decide to go all out for his bar mitzvah. The plan is to rent Dodger Stadium for the bar mitzvah party, complete with movie stars and everything. Adam even books Neil Diamond to sing the National Anthem. 

However, Benjamin does not want to go through with it, as he does not even understand the words of the haftorah he has to read as part of his bar mitzvah rite. To try to stall the planning, he secretly invites his grandfather Irwin, who is now living on an Indian reservation with a New Age woman named Sacred Feather. 

When Benjamin's grandfather arrives, it puts a kink in the planning - as Irwin had a falling out with his son Adam, both for having left Adam when he was a teenager, and for Adam's own humiliating bar mitzvah. Irwin must then pull off somehow reconciling with his son while helping his grandson deal with the question of what it means to be a "man."

Now appreciating his bar mitzvah not as an excuse to throw a party but rather as a rite of passage in his Jewish life, Benjamin gets up the courage to tell his parents to call off the over-the-top bash they had planned. After he does very well at the service the party is just a casual backyard affair with lunch, a klezmer band (with a guest-star singer and guitarist, as Adam "couldn't cancel Neil Diamond") and lots of family and friends.

Cast

Production notes
 The working title for this movie was "Lucky 13".
 While shooting this movie, Daryl Sabara was also studying for his own Bar Mitzvah. The Haftorah portion that his character chants in the movie was Sabara's actual Bar Mitzvah portion.
 DJ Quik makes a cameo as himself as the rapper at the Stein's Bar Mitzvah, which is one of many things that makes Jeremy Piven's character jealous. In episode 10 in the second season of "Entourage" (titled "The Bat Mitzvah"), DJ Quik makes a cameo as himself as the deejay at Piven's daughter's Bat Mitzvah.
 Congregation Ari-El, the synagogue where Daryl Sabara's character is to have his Bar Mitzvah, which is shown on an exterior shot, is a real synagogue in North Hollywood, called Adat Ari El, and was founded by members of the movie industry. It has an Ark (where the scrolls of the Torah are kept) built by Jewish carpenters working for Warner Brothers that was originally used on a movie set, and installed in the synagogue after the movie was completed.

Reception
The film holds 36% rating at Rotten Tomatoes. The consensus reads: "Keeping Up With the Steins is one of those comedies that play more like a corny sitcom than a theatrical movie."

References

External links
 
 
 
 

2006 films
2006 comedy films
American comedy films
2000s English-language films
Hebrew-language films
Jewish comedy and humor
Films directed by Scott Marshall
Films scored by John Debney
Religious comedy films
Films about Jews and Judaism
2006 directorial debut films
2000s American films
Bar and bat mitzvah